Ng Wai Him (born 30 June 2002) is a Hong Kong professional footballer who currently plays as a goalkeeper for Hong Kong Premier League club Southern.

Career statistics

Club

Notes

References

Living people
2002 births
People from Kowloon
Hong Kong footballers
Hong Kong youth international footballers
Association football goalkeepers
Hong Kong Premier League players
Happy Valley AA players
Southern District FC players